Jelah is a village in the municipality of Tešanj, Bosnia and Herzegovina.

Jelah is near the river Usora in the northern part of Bosnia and Herzegovina, located between Teslić and Doboj. It is administratively part of the Zenica-Doboj Canton of the Federation of Bosnia and Herzegovina.

Demographics 
According to the 2013 census, its population was 2,911. In the 1991 census, Jelah had about 1,600 residents, also meaning that the population has boomed in the 90s and 2000s.

References

External links
Official site
Independent Web Portal

Cities and towns in the Federation of Bosnia and Herzegovina
Populated places in Tešanj